Viridemas is a monotypic moth genus of the family Noctuidae. Its only species, Viridemas galena, is found in the US state of Arizona. Both the genus and species were first described by John Bernhardt Smith in 1908.

References

Hadeninae
Monotypic moth genera